Belharra, (literally "grass, weed") is a reef and a surf spot in France located off Saint-Jean-de-Luz in the Northern Basque Country, in the department of Pyrénées-Atlantiques, France. The shoal creates a violent wave, at times swallowing ships moored at Socoa before the construction of the jetty. The 8-15 metres wave forms northwest of the bay of Saint-Jean-de-Luz between Socoa and Hendaye, about 2.5 kilometers from the coast, and is watched by all surfers. It breaks only rarely, not at all in some years. It was first surfed on November 22, 2002. The shoal, between 14 and 18 metres deep consists of a plateau forming a stepped overhang. On light swell days it is a dive site. In 2013 Belharra was breaking on October 28, December 22, and in 2014 on January 7.

Big wave surfing
Surfing locations in France
Labourd
Landforms of Pyrénées-Atlantiques
Reefs of Metropolitan France
Sports venues in Pyrénées-Atlantiques